Central Dutch dialects are a group of dialects of the Dutch language from the Netherlands.
They are spoken in Holland, Utrecht Province, Southern Gelderland, North Brabant and few parts of Limburg (Netherlands) and Friesland (Vlieland).
It borders to Low Saxon without Gronings, Limburgish, Brabantian and Zeelandic.
Urkers, Frisian and Frisian mixed varieties are geographically close, too.
Mainly Hollandic-influenced Standard Dutch is spoken within the respective areas of East Flemish, West Flemish, West Limburgish, Southeast Limburgish and Gronings as well.

De analyse van taalvariatie in het Nederlandse dialectgebied has a
classification based on several characteristics:
it has some of the area of Central Dutch as Overijssel and vice versa,
Centraal westelijke dialecten and Central Dutch area is greatly contingent, 
Centraal zuidelijke dialecten is also greatly contingent with Central Dutch.

Driemaandelijkse bladen, 2002, p. 133/134, is phonetically based and has the following divisions inter alia:
 2.2 Veluws transition dialects
 3. Hollandic, North Hollandic
 3.1 Hollandic
 3.1.1 North Hollandic
 3.1.2 South Hollandic and Utrechts
 3.2 North Brabantian
 3.2.1 East Brabantian
 3.2.2 Dialecten in het Gelders Rivierengebied, West Brabantian
 4 North Belgian
 4.1. Central Brabantian
 4.2. Peripheral Brabantian
 4.2.1 Zeelandic
 4.2.2. Brabantian
 4.3. Peripheral Flemish

Both Jo Daan (South Guelderish) and Jan Goossens (Kleverlandish) have Liemers dialect as part of their respective group. Daan's classification depends on the speakers' perception of the dialects. Goossens published a study in 1970, in which he used rigid single isoglosses as a basis. Goossens justifies his classification by a few words. Daan's study dates from 1969. It was asked how the general population perceives its own and other dialects.
Goossens published a study in 1970 in which he used rigid single isoglosses as a basis.
Georg Cornelissen has rigid single isoglosses as a basis. Giebers 2008 also has Kleverlandish running into South Gelderland. The studies given above are based on several characteristics.  
In both Germany and Belgium, dialect use has declined sharply since 1970. Young people only speak regiolect. Boundaries have been drawn on the basis of old isoglosses. Stadsfries is wrongly seen as Hollandic. Frisian mixed varieties has Stadsfries together with Amelands, Bildts and Midslands.
These dialects have similarities with Frisian.
The other dialects in this group in that study are Stellingwerfs.
Stellingwerfs is not very close to them. The question cannot be answered whether Stellingwerfs varieties are more related to Frisian or to Low Saxon.
Eupen dialect is similarly different from Luxembourgish as from Hollandic. Wenker's original Rhenish fan outside the Netherlands largely has been reduced to regiolects and formal Luxembourgish.

South Guelderish 
The definition of South Low Franconian is simply done on the basis of isoglosses. South Guelderish according to a number of authors includes the dialect of the Overkwartier of Gelre or North Limburg.
The term Limburgish has a number of contradictory definitions, which also include North Limburgish. A well-founded study has Limburg North of the Uerdinger Line together with most of the South of Dutch Limburg, but with neither South Guelderish of Gelderland nor Southeast Limburgish. Most of South Low Franconian has Central Franconian components such as tonal language.
The problem of any transitional variety like South Low Franconian is that the division is arbitrary. 
In Limburg, a different dialect is spoken every 5 km  There are many methods for dividing that continuum: Levenshtein-distance is one of them, isoglosses is another, arrows method is another. Limburgish is an unclearly defined term, Kleverlandish and South Low Franconian are defined on the basis of isoglosses.

Germany 
There is a small area in the Netherlands and a large area in Germany with Kleverlandish tone accent. Kleverlandish of Germany has a lot in common with the dialects of North Limburg. In the Southern part of Kleverland, it is closer to the dialects of North Limburg than to the dialects of South Gelderland. On the other hand, the dialects in German municipalities on the border to the south of Gelderland show strong similarities with those in the south of Gelderland. 
Lameli has both the Limburgish of Germany and the Moselle Franconian of Germany under Central Franconian and not under Low Franconian. However, most studies have Limburgish as Low Franconian.
Bergish is in the Ripuarian-Low Franconian transition area. There is not too great a role in Germany of the Uerdingen Line. 
The area of Low Franconian is without for example Wuppertal. 
This classification is based on the Wenkersätze from 1877, but since then the dialect in Germany has been subject to severe erosion. In large parts hardly any dialect is spoken. All discussions about detailed dialect boundaries in Germany are now becoming historical and academic. 
Duisburg, Kleve (district), Viersen (district) and Mettmann (district) and also the city of Düsseldorf speak Low Franconian.
Cornelissen and Goossens justify their classification with a few words.

Central Franconian in Lameli's unusual classification is neither Low German nor High German.

Places with Mennonite congregations before 1800 with members partly from the area 
Elbląg
Emden
Danzig
Königsberg
Krefeld
Middelburg
Mönchengladbach

References

External links 
 Frens Bakker's 2016 thesis: Waar scheiden de dialecten in Noord-Limburg? (Where do the dialects in North Limburg separate?)
 R. Belemans, J. Kruijsen, J. Van Keymeulen (1998) Gebiedsindeling van de zuidelijk-Nederlandse dialecten, Taal en Tongval jg 50 Areas of various dialects of the Dutch language
 Song in South Guelderish

Dutch dialects
Languages of the Netherlands
Low Franconian languages